Salo or slanina (Russian and Ukrainian: сало, Belarusian: сала, Hungarian: szalonna, Polish: słonina, Czech and Slovak: slanina, Carpatho-Rusyn: солонина/solonyna, Bulgarian and Serbo-Croatian: сланина/slanina) is an Eastern European food consisting of cured slabs of fatback with or without skin. It is commonly eaten and known under different names across Eastern and Southeastern Europe, and is traditional to multiple national cuisines in the region. It is usually dry salt or brine cured. The East Slavic, Hungarian and Romanian variety is sometimes treated with paprika or other seasonings, while the South and West Slavic version is often smoked.

The Slavic word "salo" or "slanina" as applied to this type of food is often translated to English as "bacon" or "lard". Unlike lard, salo is not rendered, and unlike bacon, salo also has little or no lean meat. It is similar to Italian lardo, the main differences being the thickness of the cut (lardo is often sliced very thinly) and seasoning. East Slavic salo uses salt, garlic, black pepper and sometimes coriander in the curing process, while lardo is generally seasoned with rosemary and other herbs.

Preservation
For preservation, salo is salted and sometimes also smoked and aged in a dark and cold place, where it will last for a year or more. The slabs of fat are first cut into manageable pieces, typically 15×20 cm. Then layers of fat slabs (skin side down) topped with one-centimetre layers of salt go into a wooden box or barrel for curing.  For added flavouring and better preservation, the salo may be covered with a thick layer of paprika (usually in the more Western lands; in Russian salo with paprika is called "Hungarian"), minced garlic, or sometimes black pepper.

When salo has been aged too long or exposed to light, the fat may oxidize on the surface and become rancid, yellow and bitter-tasting. Though no longer fit for culinary use, the spoiled fat can be used as a water-repellent treatment for leather boots or bait for mouse traps, or it can simply be turned into homemade soap.

Culinary

Salo is consumed both raw and cooked. It is often fried or finely chopped with garlic as a condiment for borscht (beet soup). Small pieces of salo are added to some types of sausage. Thinly sliced salo on rye bread rubbed with garlic is a traditional snack to accompany vodka in Russia and horilka in Ukraine, where it is a particular favorite.

Salo is often chopped into small pieces and fried to render fat for cooking, while the remaining cracklings ( in Ukrainian,  in Russian,  in Lithuanian,  in Polish,  in Czech, (o) in Slovak,  in Romanian,  in Estonian, töpörtyű in Hungarian, пръжки or джумерки in Bulgarian) are used as condiments for fried potatoes or varenyky or spread on bread as a snack.

The thick pork skin that remains after the fat has been consumed is often used to make stock for soup or borscht. After boiling, the rind is often discarded. If soft enough, however, it is sometimes chopped or ground with salo, herbs, and spices and then spread on bread.

Chocolate salo

Salo in chocolate is a Ukrainian dish, created as a joke or experiment and produced since the late 90s.

The recipe is thought to have originated in an ethnic joke about the Ukrainians' cult-like attitude towards salo, similar to the Italians' attitude towards spaghetti.

See also

 Szalonna
 Lardo
 Salt pork
 Charcuterie
 List of smoked foods

References

Slavic cuisine
Animal fat products
Cooking fats
Charcuterie
Smoked meat
Pork